Jerusalem shooting can refer to:

 1956 Ramat Rachel shooting attack
 2016 Jerusalem shooting
 2017 Temple Mount shooting
 2021 Jerusalem shooting